Marek Kazmierski (born 1973) is a writer, editor and translator, specializing in literary translations from Polish into English.

In 1985 he escaped communist Poland as a child and settled in the UK. Joint winner of the Decibel Penguin Prize and sole recipient of the BIKE Magazine Philosopher of the Year award. Marek was also the managing editor of the prison literary magazine Not Shut Up, a member of the English PEN Readers & Writers committee and founded of OFF PRESS, an independent publishing house which has worked with the British Council, English PEN, the Southbank Centre, the Polish Cultural Institute and the Mayor of London. His work has been published in numerous journals, including The White Review, The Guardian, 3AM Magazine and Poetry Wales. He is also a recipient of the Visegrad Literary Grant residency at Villa Decius in Krakow, Poland, courtesy of The Polish Book Institute, and coordinated the Polish Arts Festival in Essex and was involved in developing the academic research project eMigrating Landscapes at the SSEES, University College London.

In 2016, Kazmierski was welcomed as a trustee to The Griffin Trust For Excellence In Poetry.

Prose 
 Damn the Source, London  2013 
 Allteria, London  2014 
 Blinded By the Lights, Jakub Żulczyk, translation by Marek Kazmierski, London  2020

Poetry 
 Translated from Polish into English
 Adam Mickiewicz, BAJKI / FABLES, London, 2019 
 Julian Tuwim, Children's Poems/Wiersze Dla Dzieci, Warsaw, 2018 
 Irit Amiel, Spóźniona/Delayed, Krakow, 2016 
 Wioletta Grzegorzewska, Wioletta Greg, Finite Formulae and Theories of Chance, Arc Publications 2014  (shortlisted for the 2015 Griffin Poetry Prize, selected for European Literature Night at the British Library, 2015) 
 Genowefa Jakubowska-Fijałkowska, Of me a worm and of the worm verses, London 2012 
 Joanna Lech, Nothing of This 
 Free Over Blood. Contemporary Polish poetry in translation, London 2011 
 Wioletta Grzegorzewska, Smenas Memory, London 2011 
 Grzegorz Kwiatkowski, Should not have born
 Jakobe Mansztajn, Vienna High Live )

Awards
 Shortlisted for the 2015 Griffin Poetry Prize (translator)
 Selected for European Literature Night at the British Library (translator)
 Twice nominated for the Found in Translation Award 
 Joint winner of the Penguin Decibel Prize

References

External links 
 Give The World publishing project
 Essays on Culture.pl

1973 births
Living people
Polish–English translators
British male writers
British editors
Polish male writers
Polish editors
Writers from Warsaw